The Chapel of St. Aurelianus is a 15th and 17th-century chapel that hosts the relics of Saint Aurelianus in Limoges, Haute-Vienne, France. It is an official Historic Monument.

History
The chapel was originally built in 1471 to host the relics of Saint Aurelianus that were located in the ruined church of St. Cessateur (down the Rue des Pénitents-Rouges). In the 17th century, the choir was extended and decorated in the Baroque style. During the French Revolution, the building was sold as a National Good to a member of the Confrérie de Saint Aurélien (Brotherhood of Saint Aurelianus), a brotherhood of butchers. The brotherhood still owns the chapel today. The chapel remains an important worship place for the residents of La Boucherie neighbourhood.

The chapel was listed as a Historic Monument in 1943.
In March 2019, the fourteen Stations of the Cross were stolen from the chapel.

Architecture and decoration
The chapel has an onion dome made of chestnut tree shingles.

In spite of its small size, the chapel of St. Aurelianus has rich furniture, among which:
 A 15th-century statue of Saint Catherine;
 A 15th-century group of statues representing Saint Anne and the Virgin Mary with Child Jesus eating what a local tradition says is a kidney.
 A baroque altarpiece whose centre features a painting of the Transfiguration of Jesus. The altarpiece hosts the shrine of Saint Aurelianus.

References

Roman Catholic chapels in France
15th-century Roman Catholic church buildings in France
17th-century Roman Catholic church buildings in France
15th-century establishments in France
Roman Catholic shrines in France
Churches in Haute-Vienne
Monuments historiques of Nouvelle-Aquitaine
Buildings and structures in Limoges
Baroque church buildings in France